The Volvo D5 is a type of turbocharged diesel engine developed by Volvo Cars for use in its passenger cars. The D5 engine is based on the Volvo Modular petrol engine. The D5 displaces 2.4 liters; a smaller series of two-litre engines were developed in 2010 and marketed as the Volvo D3 and D4.

History

It is an all aluminium five-cylinder engine with 20 valves and double overhead camshafts. In all but one late version it has a VGT turbocharger of the type VNT (variable nozzle turbine), common rail direct injection and cooled exhaust gas recirculation (EGR).

There are three generations of D5 engines:
 The first generation was introduced in 2001.
 The second generation was introduced in 2005. The second generation got a slight reduction in stroke and has a reduced compression ratio, a water-cooled VNT turbocharger with a bigger compressor and an electric servo motor to adjust the vanes, an improved EGR system, a throttle valve, revised intake and exhaust ports and a newer generation of common-rail direct injection with improved injectors.
 The third generation was introduced in 2009. The third generation got a further reduction in compression ratio, a two-stage turbo system (D5244T10), an improved exhaust gas recirculation (EGR) system, revised intake and exhaust ports and a newer generation of common-rail direct injection with higher pressure and piezoelectric injectors.

The engine compartments of these cars are smaller so among other things the engine has a different air intake system, different exhaust system, smaller charge air cooler and a smaller radiator.

In 2009 Volvo, in conjunction with Polestar, launched software upgrades for many of its D5 engines. These upgrades have no impact on official emission or fuel consumption figures, but produce power and torque gains of typically a little over 10%. The same upgrade was available for the mechanically-identical D5244T5. Similar upgrades have since been launched for later engines.

Marine engine
The D5244T is also offered as a marine engine by Volvo Penta under the name D3. The marinised engine is in large parts identical to D5244T. This includes crankshaft, pistons, camshafts, valves, cylinder block, cylinder head, turbo, injectors and the high pressure pump. The D3 ECU has a modified software, which e.g. gives a modified torque suited for marine applications and has a simplified starting sequence. The hardware differences between D5244T and D3 are: a water-cooled intercooler, a water-cooled exhaust manifold, a heavier monolithic crankwheel, a seawater-pump and a heat exchanger.

Models

Note: 'D5' is branding. All these engines share the five-cylinder block, although not all consistently used the 'D5' badge over time. This is due to changes in hardware and the specific model the engine was deployed in. E.g. On the S60 -05 range, the D5244T was labelled 'D5', and subsequently the D5244T5 was labelled '2.4D' as a (software) detuned version of the D5244T4 'D5' on the 05-09 range. The D5244T21 was even badged 'D4' when used in the S60 D4 AWD automatic between 2016 and 2018. Similarly the 2016 XC60 AWD branded the 190PS D5244T21 as 'D4', but the 220PS D5244T20 as 'D5', whilst the two wheel drive XC60 model of the same year used 'D4' to describe the different D4204T four-cylinder diesel engine developed in conjunction with Ford and PSA.

Volvo D3 and D4 

In 2010 Volvo debuted a new series of two-liter engines based on the third generation D5 with all the features of that engine. Three models with different power outputs were available (internal model codes D5204T, D5204T2, and D5204T5), marketed as the D3 and D4 depending on output. The direct injection pump is a Bosch CP4 with two heads, helping to produce torque of around  even at low engine speeds.

The D3 is the lower-powered series, with the higher output D5204T referred to as the D4.

In April 2011 the original D5204T2 was replaced by the upgraded D3 version, which featured Volvo's "Volvo Environment Diesel" (VED) technologies to lower emissions and consumption. Power and torque figures remained largely unchanged. In April 2012 a lower tuned engine, the  D5204T7 was announced; it was marketed as a "D3" and meanwhile the  version changed its name to "D4".

Specifications

Successor

In autumn of 2013 the new Volvo Engine Architecture was introduced. The 5-cylinder D5 began a process of being gradually phased out along with the V70/XC70 and first generation XC60. Production of the D5 type engines ended in 2017.

References

External links
 D5 215 HP Official press-release 

D5
Straight-five engines
Diesel engines by model